Tân Quang may refer to several places in Vietnam, including:

 Tân Quang, Bắc Giang, a rural commune of Lục Ngạn District
 Tân Quang, a ward of Tuyên Quang
 Tân Quang, a rural commune of Sông Công
 Tân Quang, Hà Giang, a rural commune of Bắc Quang District

See also
 Tan Qiang (born 1998), Chinese badminton player